The disk-over-water method is a technique for causing sleep deprivation in laboratory animals.

The subject—for example, a rat or pigeon—is placed on a disk. When the subject shows signs of falling asleep, the disk begins to slowly rotate, at a few revolutions per minute. The subject must walk to keep pace with the disk, or it will be carried into a pool of water.

See also
Flowerpot technique

References

Animal testing techniques
Ethically disputed research practices towards animals
Sleeplessness and sleep deprivation